Novosibirsk Globus Theatre is a theatre in Novosibirsk city, Siberia, Russia.

It was founded in 1930 in Novosibirsk city and was the first stationary theatre. Formerly it was known as  Young Spectator's theatre, and was focused on youth and children. 

The current building of the theatre was built in 1984.

References

External links
 Official Website
Theatres built in the Soviet Union
Theatres in Novosibirsk
Tsentralny City District, Novosibirsk